St. Gervais-Megève Hockey Club (also known as Yétis du Mont-Blanc) is a French ice hockey club that plays in Division 1, France's second-highest ice hockey league. They formed as a merger of clubs Megève and Saint-Gervais.

History
The team was founded in 1986 and plays home games at the arenas of Saint-Gervais and Megève.

They won two French championships in 1987 and 1988, the first two seasons after the merger. Additionally, Megève was champion in 1984 and Saint-Gervais in 1969, 1974, 1975, 1983, 1985, and 1986.

Former nickname : Avalanche Mont-Blanc.

Former players

 Matt Amado
 Brandon Card
 Jean-Philippe Carey
 Alexandre Gagnon
 Jonathan Provencher

 Ales Cerny

 Mathias Arnaud
 Numa Besson
 Henri-Corentin Buysse
 Sébastien Borini
 Arthur Cocar
 Christopher Lepers
 Clément Masson
 Alexandre Vincent

 Edgars Adamovičs

 Garip Saliji

Former coaches
 Ari Salo

External links
 Official website 

Ice hockey teams in France
Sport in Haute-Savoie